Mahtinya Buzurg is a village in Domariaganj, Uttar Pradesh, India.

References

Villages in Siddharthnagar district